Karl David Ilgen (26 February 1763, in Sehna, a village near Eckartsberga – 17 September 1834, in Berlin) was a German Protestant Old Testament scholar and classical philologist.

He studied theology and philology at the University of Leipzig, and was later appointed rector at the munincipal gymnasium in Naumburg (1789). In 1794 he became a professor of oriental languages at the University of Jena. From 1802 to 1831, he was rector of the Landesschule Pforta.

Ilgen is credited as the first to use the term "epyllion" in classical literature, coining the term in 1796 when describing the Homeric "Hymn to Hermes".

Associated works 
 "Jobi antiquiss. carminis Hebraica natura atque virtutes", 1789.
 "Hymni Homerici cum reliquis carminibus minoribus Homero tributi solitis et Batrachomyomachia", 1796
 "Opuscula varia philologica", 1797.
 "Die Urkunden des ersten Buchs von Moses in ihrer Urgestalt", 1798 – The records of the first books of Moses in their original form.
 "Skolia, hoc est Carmina convivalia Graecorum", 1798.
 "Animadversiones philologicae et criticae in Carmen Virgilianum quod Copa inscribitum", 1820.

References 

1763 births
1834 deaths
People from Eckartsberga
18th-century German Protestant theologians
19th-century German Protestant theologians
German classical philologists
German orientalists
19th-century German male writers
Leipzig University alumni
Academic staff of the University of Jena
German male non-fiction writers
18th-century German male writers